The Taff Ely & Rhymney Valley is a football league covering the Taff-Ely and Rhymney Valley in South Wales. The leagues are at the seventh and eighth levels of the Welsh football league system.

Divisions
The league is composed of two divisions.

Member clubs 2022–23

Premier Division

AFC Bargoed
Cascade YC
Cefn Hengoed
Church Village
Cilfynydd 'A'
Cwrt Rawlin
FC Graig
FC Trecenydd
Pickford Stars
Pontypridd
Rhydyfelin
Rhydyfelin Non Political
Talbot Green
Ynysybwl

First Division

Aber Valley reserves
Caerphilly Athletic reserves
Caerphilly United
Cwm Welfare
Cwm Welfare reserves
FC Graig reserves
Gelligaer
Gilfach
Llantwit Fardre reserves
Masons Arms 
Nelson Cavaliers reserves
Pontypridd reserves
Rhydyfelin Non-Political
Rhydyfelin reserves
Talbot Green reserves
Trallwn Workingmens Club
Treforest Reserves

Promotion and relegation
Promotion from the Premier Division is possible to the South Wales Alliance League, with the champion of the league playing the other tier 7 champions from the South Wales regional leagues via play-off games to determine promotion.

Champions (Premier Division)

2006–07: – Ynysybwl
2008–09: – Penyrheol
2012–13: – Penrhos FC
2013–14: – Dynamo Aber
2014–15: – Llanbradach
2015–16: – Ynysybwl Athletic
2016–17: – Ynysybwl Athletic
2017–18: – Nelson Cavaliers
2018–19: – Ynysybwl Athletic
2019–20: – Nelson Cavaliers
2020–21: – Season cancelled due to Coronavirus pandemic 
2021–22: – Church Village

Cup Competitions
All teams entered in to both Premier and Division One compete in two domestic cup competitions each season, the Bernard Martin Cup and Greyhound Cup

References

External links
 Taff Ely & Rhymney Valley League

8